Gading Marine Industry also known as Gading Marine is a Malaysian private company engaged in maritime industry including shipbuilding, marine engineering, system integration, ship fabricator, ship maintenance and repair services. Gading Marine operates under its parent company Gading Group and its headquarters located in Selangor. The company also owned a shipyard in other location in the country.

History
Gading Marine works closely with local universities such as University of Kuala Lumpur in the development and construction of the boats for use in Malaysia as well as training related university students in the field of marine.

In 2019, Gading Marine has delivered two fast interceptor craft FAC PC 31 to the Royal Malaysia Police.

In 2020, Gading Marine wins a tender to supply six fast interceptor craft G2000 FIC 18M to the Royal Malaysian Navy.

Capabilities 
Gading Marine specializes in the field of shipbuilding as a builder of fast interceptor and assault craft. It is fully fabricated and assembled locally at a local shipyard in Lumut, Perak. Gading Marine has built and supplied local law enforcement agencies such as marine police and naval force.

Products
Gading Marine FIC / FAC 
Gading Marine 17 foot RHIB
 Commercial boat and vessel

References

Defense companies of Malaysia
Malaysian brands
Shipbuilding companies of Malaysia
Shipbuilding companies
Privately held companies of Malaysia